The Office of Kentucky Nature Preserves is an agency of the Commonwealth of Kentucky in the United States dedicated to the protection of Kentucky's natural heritage. The agency's primary focus is protecting rare and endangered species habitat.  It oversees a statewide program of nature preserves, the Kentucky Wild Rivers Program, and the "Nature's Finest" license plate program of the Kentucky Heritage Land Conservation Fund Board. The program was formerly known as the "Kentucky State Nature Preserves Commission", from 1976 until a reorganization in 2018.

As of July 1, 2018, Office of Kentucky Nature Preserves programs include:
 19,217 acres owned by KNP in 41 State Nature Preserves;	
 6,245 acres owned by KNP in 6 State Natural Areas;	
 7,324 acres dedicated  by KNP in 22 State Nature Preserves owned by partnering agencies;	
 11,894 acres in conservation easements at 52 KHLCF natural areas owned by local concerns; 
 59,556 acres of deed restricted property in 26 KHLCF natural areas owned by other state agencies; 
 8,260 acres owned by private landowners and other agencies in 59 Registered Natural Areas;
 26,382 acres owned by private landowners and other agencies in 9 Wild Rivers Corridors.

The grand total of 112,000 acres in these programs is only 0.44% of Kentucky's 25 million acres.

Statewide Nature Preserve / Natural Area List:

Abbey of Gethsemane Registered Natural Area  
Axe Lake Swamp State Nature Preserve
Bad Branch Falls State Nature Preserve
Bat Cave and Cascade Caverns State Nature Preserves 
Beargrass Creek State Nature Preserve 
Bissell Bluff SNA
Blackacre Nature Preserve and Historic Homestead
Blanton Forest State Nature Preserve
Blue Licks State Nature Preserve
Boone County Cliffs SNP 
Bouteloua Barrens SNP
Brigadoon State Nature Preserve 
Camp Nelson Heritage National Monument
Chaney Lake SNP 
Crooked Creek Barrens SNP 
Cumberland Falls SPNP 
Cypress Creek SNP 
Dinsmore Woods SNP
Drennon Creek State Nature Preserve  
Eastview Barrens SNP 
Flat Rock Glade SNP 
Floracliff SNP 
Frances Johnson Palk SNP 
Goodrum Cave SNP 
Hi Lewis Pine Barrens SNP
James E. Bickford SNP 
Jesse Stuart SNP 
Jim Scudder SNP 
John B. Stephenson Memorial Forest SNP 
John James Audubon State Park State Nature Preserve 
Julian Savanna SNP 
Kingdom Come State Park State Nature Preserve
Logan County Glade SNP    
Lower Howard's Creek Heritage Park and SNP 
Martin's Fork SNA
Metropolis Lake SNP 
Natural Bridge State Park State Nature Preserve
Newman's Bluff SNA
Obion Creek SNP including Murphy's Pond 
Perryville Battlefield State Historic Site
Pilot Knob State Nature Preserve 
Pine Mountain SPNP 
Quiet Trails SNP 
Raymond Athey Barrens SNP 
River Cliffs SNP 
Short's Goldenrod SNP
Six Mile Island State Nature Preserve 
Springhouse Barrens SNP
Stone Mountain SNA
Terrapin Creek SNP 
Thompson Creek Glades SNP 
Three Ponds SNP 
Tom Dorman SNP    
Vernon-Douglas SNP    
Woodburn Glade SNP
 SNP indicates State Nature Preserve
 SPNP indicates State Park Nature Preserve
 SNA indicates State Natural Area

Projects
Kentucky River Palisades

References

External links
 

Nature Preserves
Protected areas of Kentucky